Varazdat (Middle Persian: Warāzdātan), was an Iranian nobleman who served as the marzban of Persian Armenia from 560 to 564. During his governorship, Armenia was relatively peaceful. In 561, the Sasanian Empire and the Byzantine Empire, concluded a peace treaty known as the "Fifty-Year Peace Treaty", which ended the Lazic War. In 564, Varazdat was succeeded by Chihor-Vishnasp.

Sources

  Les dynasties de la Caucasie chrétienne de l’Antiquité jusqu’au XIXe siècle ; Tables généalogiques et chronologiques, Rome, 1990.

 

Year of death unknown
6th-century Iranian people
Sasanian governors of Armenia
Year of birth unknown